The King of the White Elephant ( or Prajao Changpeuk; RTGS: Phrachao Chang Phueak) is a 1940 Thai historical drama film.

Based on a novel and produced by Pridi Banomyong and released before Thailand's involvement in World War II, the English-language film carried a propaganda message from anti-war interests in Thailand, that Thailand should remain neutral, and only go to war to defend its sovereignty against foreign invaders. However, on December 8, 1941, Thailand was occupied by the Japanese and officially sided with the Axis powers during the war.

Plot
Set in the Ayutthaya Kingdom of the 16th century, King Chakra is going about his usual palace duties, granting audiences to his advisers, including his Lord Chamberlain, who is keen to see the king fulfill his royal duty of taking 366 wives, including, hopefully among them, the chamberlain's own daughter.

However, the threat of invasion by the King of Honsa (Thai: หงสาวดี Hongsawadi, Burmese: Hanthawaddy kingdom of Burma) has King Chakra pre-occupied. The peace-loving King Chakra at first wants to negotiate for peace, but is unsuccessful, and finds himself forced to go to war to stop the Honsa (Hanthawaddy) invasion.

Cast
 Renu Kritayakon as King Chakra
 Nit Mahakanok as Governor of Kanburi
 Pairin Nilsen as Renoo
 Suvat Nilsen as Lord Chamberlain
 Pradab Rabilvongse as King of Honsa
 Luang Srisurang as Minister of War

Production
Pridi Banomyong, at the time Minister of Finance in the government of Prime Minister Plaek Pibulsonggram, produced the film, which was based on an English-language novel he had written. The cast of the movie were lecturers and students from Thammasat University, which Pridi had founded.

The film was made with the intent of conveying Pridi's conception of peace to international audiences, and was filmed in English, the first Thai film to do so. The film also took its themes from Buddhist philosophy, that there is no happiness that is greater than peace, but also carried the message that Pridi thought Thailand was ready to fight a war of aggression by any foreign invaders.

The movie was screened in New York City and Singapore.

After Japan invaded Thailand on December 8, 1941, Pridi became a leader of the Free Thai Movement resistance movement, while the Thai military dictators sided with Japan in the Axis Powers and declared war on Great Britain and the United States.

Restoration
The King of the White Elephant was among two films chosen for a restoration project launched by the Thailand Ministry of Culture, with cooperation from Technicolor and the Thai Film Foundation. The film is the oldest surviving Thai film in its complete form.

The 35-mm negative of the film had actually been lost during World War II, but a 16-mm print that had been archived in the Library of Congress survived, and a new 35-mm copy was made from that print. Also, two versions of the film survive, the full 100-minute version and a 50-minute version. Both versions of the unrestored film were released on DVD in 2005 by the Thai Film Foundation.

The restored print was presented at the inaugural Phuket Film Festival in October 2007.

The other film selected for the 2005 restoration effort was The Boat House (Ruen Pae), a 1962 musical romance.

See also
 White elephant
 White elephant (pachyderm)

References

External links

 The King of the White Elephant at SiamZone 

1940 films
Thai black-and-white films
1940 drama films
1940s war drama films
Films set in the 16th century
Films based on Thai novels
Films set in Thailand
Thai national heritage films
Thai war drama films